Tycho is a masculine given name, a latinization of Greek Τύχων, from the name of  Tyche, the Greek goddess of fortune or luck.
The Russian form of the name is Tikhon (Тихон).

People
Given name
 Tycho Brahe (1546–1601), Danish nobleman and astronomer
 Saint Tikhon of Zadonsk (1724–1783), Russian bishop
 Tycho van Meer (born 1974), Dutch field hockey striker
Surname
 Tommy Tycho (1928–2013), Hungarian-Australian pianist, conductor, composer
Pseudonym
 Tycho (musician) (born 1977) (Scott Hansen), American ambient music artist and producer, also known as ISO50

Astronomy
 Tycho (lunar crater)
 Tycho Brahe (Martian crater)
 The Tycho-1 Catalogue or Tycho-2 Catalogue of stars
 SN 1572, a supernova remnant, often called Tycho's supernova
 Tycho G, the companion star of SN 1572
 1677 Tycho Brahe, an asteroid

Fiction
 Tycho, a desert ranger henchman from the computer game Fallout
 Tycho, a shipboard AI in the computer game Marathon
 Tycho Brahe, a character from the Penny Arcade webcomic based on writer Jerry Holkins
 Tycho Celchu, a character in the Star Wars Universe
 Brother-Captain Tycho, a character in the Warhammer 40,000 universe
 Tycho City, a city located on Earth's moon (presumably on/near Tycho Crater), mentioned in the Star Trek franchise
 Tycho Station, a setting in The Expanse novel series and its accompanying TV series

See also 
 Tyco (disambiguation)
 Taiko (disambiguation)

Given names of Greek language origin